Bungaree is a closed station located in the town of Bungaree, on the Ararat railway line in Victoria, Australia. The station was one of 35 closed to passenger traffic on 4 October 1981 as part of the New Deal timetable for country passengers. A new high speed deviation has been built away from the station site as part of the Regional Fast Rail project, with the original line remaining open retained as an extended crossing loop.

References

External links
 Melway map at street-directory.com.au

Disused railway stations in Victoria (Australia)